UC-35 may refer to:

 , a World War I German coastal minelaying submarine
 Cessna Citation V, an airplane with a United States military designation of "UC-35"